John Manenti (born  1972) is an Australian rugby union coach. He is currently head coach of the Australian sevens team.

Career
As a rugby player, Manenti was a prop for Sydney clubs Western Suburbs and Sydney University in the 1990s. Manenti and Sydney University's former head coach Chris Malone are brothers-in-law.

He coached the Wallaroos at the 2010 Women's Rugby World Cup in England, where team won the bronze medal defeating  22–8 in the third place match. He was head coach at Eastwood for their three Shute Shield victories in 2011, 2014 and 2015, and also won the Australian Club Championship with Eastwood in 2015.

In 2017, Manenti coached the Greater Sydney Rams in the National Rugby Championship, following the takeover of the franchise by the Eastwood Rugby Club. He later became the director of rugby at Eastwood.

After Tim Walsh departed to coach the national men's sevens team in 2018, Manenti was appointed head coach of the national women's sevens team. In 2022 he swapped roles with Walsh and became head coach of the Australian men's sevens team.

Coaching honours 

Australia men's 7s
World Rugby Sevens Series
 Winner: 2021–22

Wallaroos
Rugby World Cup
Bronze medal: 2010

Australia women's 7s
World Rugby Sevens Series
 Winner: 2017–18
 Runner-up: 2020

Eastwood
Australian Club Championship
 Winner: 2015

Shute Shield
 Winner: 2011, 2014 and 2015

Personal life
His son Ben Manenti is a cricketer for Sydney Sixers.

References

Year of birth missing (living people)
Living people
Australian rugby union coaches